Spanbroekmolen is a small group of farms in Heuvelland, a municipality located in the Belgian province of West Flanders. The hamlet is sited on one of the highest points of the Messines Ridge, in between the villages of Kemmel, Wijtschate and Wulvergem.

History
 
Spanbroekmolen was named after a windmill that stood on the site for three centuries until it was ruined by the Germans on 1 November 1914. In World War I, the area was the site of intense and sustained fighting between German and British forces. Between 1914 and 1917, the Western Front ran through the area, and the original buildings were completely destroyed. Because of its strategic position on the Messines Ridge south of the Ypres Salient, the Germans used the site for a front-line fortification. As the Allied attacks along the Western Front became more formidable, the Germans added further defences and trench positions at Spanbroekmolen and connected their original lines with the neighbouring strongpoints, which were code-named Peckham and Kruisstraat by the British.

On 12 March 1915, Lieutenant C. G. Martin volunteered to lead a small bombing party against a section of the enemy trenches at Spanbroekmolen which was holding up the advance. Before he started he was wounded, but, taking no notice, he carried on with the attack which was completely successful. He and his small party held the trench against all counter-attacks for two and a half hours until a general withdrawal was ordered and Martin was awarded the Victoria Cross. He later achieved the rank of Brigadier and served during World War II.

In spring 1916, the Germans conducted two gas attacks on Wulverghem from their Spanbroekmolen position. These gas attacks were part of the sporadic fighting which took place between battles in the Ypres Salient. The British Second Army held the ground from Messines Ridge north to Steenstraat, opposite the German XXIII Reserve Corps. From  British artillery-fire exploded several gas cylinders in the German lines around Spanbroekmolen, which released greenish-yellow clouds of gas. A gas alert was given on 25 April, when the wind began to blow from the north-east and routine work was suspended; on 29 April, two German soldiers deserted and warned that an attack was imminent. The first German attack began just after midnight on 30 April and a cloud of a chlorine and phosgene mixture moved on the wind through no man's land. A second gas attack was launched on 17 June but the British managed to repulse the German patrols.

In the Battle of Messines  (7–14 June 1917), a major attack on Spanbroekmolen and the neighbouring strongpoints Peckham and Kruisstraat was planned by the British. It was known that, due to its importance, the Germans intended to hold the hill at Spanbroekmolen at all costs. In order to break the heavily armed positions, the British employed tunnelling companies of the Royal Engineers with the aim of placing a series of mines beneath the German lines on the Messines Ridge. In December 1915, 250th Tunnelling Company dug a  shaft and then handed over the work to 3rd Canadian Tunnelling Company in January 1916. Other operating changes – including a brief tenure of 175th Tunnelling Company at Spanbroekmolen in April 1916 – occurred until 171st Tunnelling Company took over and extended the work to the German lines, driving the tunnel forward for seven months until it was beneath the powerful German position. A branch was started and inclined down to  depth. By mid-February 1917 the branch had been driven  and passed the German lines. At that point, the German counter mining activities damaged  of the branch gallery and some of the main tunnel. The British decided to abandon the branch gallery because aggressive counter-mining would likely have alerted the Germans to the presence of a deep-mining scheme. On 3 March 1917, the Germans blew the main tunnel with a heavy charge laid from their Ewald shaft, leaving it beyond repair and resulting in the  explosive charge being cut off for three months. The British started a new gallery alongside the old main tunnel which after  cut into the original workings. Although tested fully just a few hours before the attack, officers used torch batteries to prove the circuits. The mines at Messines were detonated at 3:10 a.m. on 7 June 1917. The Spanbroekmolen mine exploded 15 seconds late, by which time soldiers of the 36th (Ulster) Division had already been ordered to go over the top, had left their trenches and begun to move across no-man's land. In addition to obliterating the German fortifications, falling debris from the blast also killed a number of British soldiers, some of whom are buried at Lone Tree CWGC Cemetery nearby.

Commemoration
The mine crater was acquired in 1929 by the Toc H foundation in Poperinge. Sometimes also called "Lone Tree Crater", it is today recognised as peace memorial and known as "Pool of Peace". To its south lies the Lone Tree CWGC Cemetery, to its north-east the Spanbroekmolen British CWGC Cemetery.

Gallery

See also

 List of World War I memorials and cemeteries in Flanders

Citations

References

Books
 
 
 
 
 
 
 
 
 

Journals
 

Newspapers

External links

 Spanbroekmolen Mine Crater Memorial — The Pool of Peace
 Tunnelling companies RE
 Database with technical specifications of the mines in the Battle of Messines  (Dutch)
 Messines Ridge photo essay 
 Map of the mines in the Battle of Messines
Map of the mines in the Battle of Messines (Google Earth)
 Battle of Messines Ridge with images of the mine craters
 The Western Front Today, Messines

 

1917 in Belgium
Explosions in 1917
World War I memorials in Belgium
Ypres Salient